Christopher Patrick Simpson (born 9 January 1982) in Brisbane, Queensland, is an Australian cricketer and former captain of the Queensland Bulls in Australian domestic cricket. He is a right arm offbreak bowler and right-handed batsman.

Simpson attended school at Villanova College in Coorparoo, where he played for the 1st XI from grade 9 to 12. Simpson was originally a fast bowler, turning to offspin in 2001–02. 

He played his first Pura Cup in 2002–03 season against New South Wales, but it wasn't till 2005–06 that Simpson started tasting success. He played four Pura Cup games and was selected for the Prime Minister's XI against the West Indies. He faced the West Indies again, playing for Queensland, and picked up four wickets. His batting impressed, with two half-centuries in a total of 158 runs at 26.33. 

He credits a stint with Forfarshire in the Scottish Cricket League, during his younger days, as being hugely important in developing him both as a player and a person.

Married to former Miss Universe Australia winner 2007, Kimberley Busteed.  They have two daughters Victoria and Evie.

References

External links
Player profile from cricinfo

1982 births
Living people
Australian cricketers
Queensland cricket captains
Queensland cricketers
People educated at Villanova College (Australia)
Cricketers from Brisbane
Melbourne Stars cricketers